Philippe Descombes is a French racing driver currently competing in the TCR Asia Series. Having previously competed in the Porsche Carrera Cup Asia, Formula 3 Asia and Formula 2000 Asia amongst others.

Racing career
Descombes began his career in 1996 in the Championnat de France Formule Renault, he finished 13th in the standings in 1997. In 1999 he switched to the Formula 2000 Asia series. He switched to the Ericsson Formula Challenge in 2000, winning the title that year. In 2001 he raced in the Macau Asian Formula 2000 Challenge also winning the title the same year. He raced in the Formula 3 Asia in 2002 and in the Porsche Carrera Cup Asia in 2012. 

In September 2015 it was announced that he would race in the first ever TCR Asia Series round in Sepang, driving a SEAT León Cup Racer for Asia Racing Team.

References

External links
 

Living people
French Formula Three Championship drivers
TCR Asia Series drivers
French racing drivers
Year of birth missing (living people)
24H Series drivers
Asia Racing Team drivers